Major-General Robert Bernard Bruce  is a former British Army officer.

Military career
Bruce was commissioned into the Royal Scots on 5 September 1986. He became commanding officer of the Royal Scots in February 2006 and then of The Royal Scots Borderers, 1st Battalion, The Royal Regiment of Scotland, as the Royal Scots and King's Own Scottish Borderers merged that year. He went on to be commander 4th Mechanised Brigade in 2011 and was deployed as commander of Task Force Helmand in October 2012. Following his return to the United Kingdom in April 2013, he became Director Combat at Army Headquarters. He was deployed again as Deputy Commander of a multi-national task force in the Middle East in December 2014 and then became Director Capability in the Army Headquarters in November 2015. He became Military Secretary and General Officer, Scotland, in July 2017. Bruce retired from the British Army on 26 February 2020.

He became Colonel of the Royal Regiment of Scotland in July 2016.

References

 

|-

British Army major generals
Companions of the Distinguished Service Order
Commanders of the Order of the British Empire
British Army personnel of the War in Afghanistan (2001–2021)
Royal Scots officers
Royal Regiment of Scotland officers